Kungsbacka Municipality (Kungsbacka kommun) is a municipality in Halland County on the Swedish west coast, some 30 km south of Gothenburg. The municipal seat is located in the town Kungsbacka.

In 1969 Tölö was merged into the City of Kungsbacka. In 1971 the municipality was created when the city amalgamated with Särö. The final step was taken in 1974 when three more former municipalities were added to form the new entity.

Kungsbacka Municipality is closely integrated in the region of Metropolitan Gothenburg, but despite this it is administratively not a part of Västra Götaland County like the rest of the region.

A local geographical landmark is the glacial ridge Fjärås bräcka, to the south of Kungsbacka, but it is the coast that is the predominant geographical feature. The municipality receives its drinking water from the nearby lake Lygnern; the water undergoes a natural filtering process as it trickles through the ridge, contributing to its quality.

Localities 
There are 22 urban areas (also called a tätort or locality) in Kungsbacka Municipality.

In the table the localities are listed according to the size of the population as of 31 December 2005. The municipal seat is in bold characters.

1) Billdal is a bimunicipal  locality. About 3,000 of the inhabitants are in Gothenburg Municipality.

2) A minor part of Frillesås is in Varberg Municipality.

References

External links 

Kungsbacka Municipality - Official site

Municipalities of Halland County
Metropolitan Gothenburg